The Historic Society of Lancashire and Cheshire is a historical society and registered charity founded for the purpose of "collecting, preserving, arranging and publishing such Historical Documents, Antiquities…Specimens of Ancient and Medieval Art, etc. as are connected with the Counties Palatine of Lancaster and Chester…" on 20 June 1848. The society became a registered charity (No. 224825) in 1964.

Activities
The society organises lectures and other events, and has also amassed an extensive collection of materials and publications relating to the history and antiquities of both counties.

Journal
It publishes a peer-reviewed journal, the Transactions of the Historic Society of Lancashire and Cheshire annually.

Officers

Presidents

Transactions editors

Secretaries

Treasurers

See also

 Chetham Society
 Lancashire and Cheshire Antiquarian Society
 Lancashire Parish Register Society
 Manchester Region History Review
 Record Society of Lancashire and Cheshire

References

External links
 

1848 establishments in the United Kingdom
Regional and local learned societies of the United Kingdom
Historical societies of the United Kingdom
Organizations established in 1848